Plas Halt is an unstaffed halt on the narrow gauge Ffestiniog Railway in Wales, which was built in 1836 to carry dressed slate from Blaenau Ffestiniog to Porthmadog for export by sea.

History
The halt was established in 1963. Construction took place on the evening of Thursday 30 May 1963 and the morning of Friday 31 May 1963 and it was officially opened later that same day by Mr John Bibby the then owner of Plas Tan-y-Bwlch. The halt was intended to serve a proposed chalet development on the estate. Subsequently, it has been much used in connection with courses at the Snowdonia National Park Environmental Study Centre now based at Plas Tan-y-Bwlch. A stone passenger shelter was built at Plas Halt by volunteers from the Thames Valley Group of the Ffestiniog Railway Society in 1989. The halt is located at Zigzag Crossing to the North of Tyler's Curve above Plas Tan-y-Bwlch at a height of 375 ft. and a distance from Porthmadog of 6 miles 19 chains. A century earlier, Mr William E. Oakeley of Plas Tan-y-Bwlch had a private station nearby.

Plas Halt is used chiefly by visitors and guests of Plas Tan-y-Bwlch and also by walkers using the footpaths from Zigzag Crossing. Visitors can also walk down into Maentwrog using these paths. The gardens at Plas Tan-y-Bwlch are open to the public and combined train and garden tickets are available. Trains call at this halt only on request and intending passengers are advised to check with the Ffestiniog Railway Company before embarking on their journey.

Services

References

Further reading

External links 
 The Ffestiniog Railway Company's website
 Ffestiniog Railway Timetables
 The Snowdonia National Park Study Centre
 Multimap Map of Plas Tan-y-Bwlch

Heritage railway stations in Gwynedd
Ffestiniog Railway
Maentwrog
Railway stations in Great Britain opened in 1963
Railway stations built for UK heritage railways